The , Hellenized as  was a lowly Byzantine palace position and rank.

From sigillographic evidence, in the 9th century the rank was held by senior provincial officials, i.e. The term last occurs in the 10th century.

References

Sources 

 
 

Byzantine court titles
Byzantine palace offices